Maung Shwe Prue Chowdhury is a Jatiya Party (Ershad) politician and the former Member of Parliament of Bandarban District.

Career
Chowdhury was appointed the Governor of Bandarban District during Bangladesh Krishak Sramik Awami League rule.

Chowdhury was elected to parliament from Bandarban District as a Jatiya Party candidate in 1986 and 1988. He was the 14 Chief of the Bohmong Circle.

References

1998 deaths
3rd Jatiya Sangsad members
4th Jatiya Sangsad members
Jatiya Party politicians
Marma people